The men's 440 yards hurdles event at the 1954 British Empire and Commonwealth Games was held on 1 and 4 July at the Empire Stadium in Vancouver, Canada.

Medalists

Results

Heats
Qualification: First 3 in each heat (Q) qualify directly for the final.

Final

References

Athletics at the 1954 British Empire and Commonwealth Games
1954